The mixed Shuttle Hurdle Relay at the 2021 World Athletics Relays was held at the Silesian Stadium on 1 May.

Records 
Prior to the competition, the records were as follows:

Results

Final

References 

2021 World Athletics Relays
Mixed-sex athletics
IAAF World Relays 2021
Relays